Good Counsel GAA is a Gaelic Athletic Association club in County Dublin, Ireland. The club is based in Drimnagh in the south of Dublin.

History
The club was formed in 1954. The club's most famous player was Kevin Moran. The 'Counsel', a thriving Gaelic Football, Hurling and Camogie club has served the South Dublin parish of Drimnagh and beyond for the past 50 years.

Boasting a sizeable adult and juvenile membership, it can justifiably say that it is the biggest sporting club in the area, with approx. 800 members. There are boys and girls playing hurling, football and camogie from nursery up to minor level. The club is represented at intermediate hurling, senior camogie and at intermediate football level with junior teams in football, and camogie. It also has an ongoing commitment to a comprehensive coaching programme with the focus firmly fixed on the future.

In March 2016, the club merged with Liffey Gaels of nearby Ballyfermot for their 2016 Junior B Hurling Campaign and would be competing as Counsel Gaels. Over the coming years, other teams from both clubs began to merge. The men's section of the club played their last match under the "Good Counsel" name on November 19, 2019 in a 4–14 to 0-12 Quarter-final defeat against Lucan Sarsfields in the 2019 Dubin U21 Hurling 'C' Championship.

The Ladies' section of the club fully merged with Liffey Gaels in 2022.

The Camogie section of the club continues to play under the "Good Counsel" name, fielding 3 teams at Adult level as of 2022.

Honours
 Dublin Junior B Hurling Championship (1) 2009
 Dublin Minor Hurling Championship

References

Gaelic games clubs in Dublin (city)
Gaelic football clubs in Dublin (city)
Hurling clubs in Dublin (city)